The School of Nursing at Ayub Teaching Hospital is located in Abbottabad, Khyber Pakhtunkhwa, Pakistan. Is it the nursing education unit of Ayub Medical College, however most teaching and training occurs at Ayub Teaching Hospital. The school offers students a Bachelor of Science in Nursing which is a four-year academic degree in the science and principles of nursing accredited by the Pakistan Nursing Council. It prepares nurses for a professional role away from the bedside with coursework in nursing science, research, leadership and nursing informatics. The objective is to train nurses, midwives, lady health visitors and nursing auxiliaries dedicated on the care of individuals, families and communities. The school works under the supervision of the Khyber Pakhtunkhwa Provincial Health Services Academy.

See also 
 Ayub Teaching Hospital
 Pakistan Nursing Council
 Ayub Medical College

References

External links
Ayub Medical College
Ayub Alumni Website

Khyber Medical University
Medical colleges in Khyber Pakhtunkhwa
1998 establishments in Pakistan
Educational institutions established in 1998
Abbottabad District